Zhang En'ge (born 28 January 1997) is a Chinese footballer currently playing as a defender for Dandong Tengyue.

Club career
Zhang was loaned to China League Two side Dongguan United for the 2021 season.

Career statistics

Club
.

References

1997 births
Living people
Chinese footballers
Association football defenders
China League Two players
Shanghai Port F.C. players